Glacial earthquakes are earthquakes as large as magnitude 5.1 that occur in glaciated areas where the glacier moves faster than one kilometer per year.

The number of glacial earthquakes in Greenland shows a peak every year in July, August and September, and the number is increasing over time. In a study using data from January 1993 through October 2005, more events were detected every year since 2002, and twice as many events were recorded in 2005 as there were in any other year. This increase in the numbers of glacial earthquakes in Greenland may be a response to global warming.

Seismic waves are also generated by the Whillans Ice Stream, a large, fast-moving river of ice pouring from the West Antarctic Ice Sheet into the Ross Ice Shelf. Two bursts of seismic waves are released every day, each one equivalent to a magnitude 7 earthquake, and are seemingly related to the tidal action of the Ross Sea. The seismic waves are recorded at seismographs around Antarctica, and even as far away as Australia, a distance of more than 6,400 kilometers. Because the movement takes place over such a long period of time—10 to 25 minutes—it cannot be felt by scientists standing on the moving glacier. It is not known if these events are related to global warming.

See also
Cryoseism

References

Ice sheets
Bodies of ice of Greenland
Seismology
Glaciers
Effects of climate change
Environment of the Arctic